The yellow-billed turaco (Tauraco macrorhynchus) is a species of bird in the family Musophagidae. It is found in Angola, Cameroon, Republic of the Congo, Democratic Republic of the Congo, Ivory Coast, Equatorial Guinea, Gabon, Ghana, Guinea, Liberia, Nigeria, and Sierra Leone.

The range of the yellow-billed turaco has a discontinuity, due to the dryer climate in the Dahomey Gap, separating two morphologically distinct subspecies, T. m. macrorhynchus from Sierra Leone to Ghana and T. m. verreauxii from Nigeria, through DR Congo to Angola. It has been proposed that they be recognised as two phylogenetic species, based on the biogeography, morphology and molecular phylogeny, and that the species be transferred to genus Musophaga, because they are not recovered with other Tauraco species.

References

yellow-billed turaco
Birds of the Gulf of Guinea
Birds of Central Africa
Birds of West Africa
yellow-billed turaco
yellow-billed turaco
Taxonomy articles created by Polbot